Live and Rare is a compilation album by alternative rock band Jane's Addiction, released in 1991 through Warner Bros. Records. The release is essentially a collection of early b-sides, demos, and live cuts.

Versions
The original two versions of this compilation were released in Japan in late 1991. The first is the regular release; it come with a separate spinal label with the album information in Japanese and a lyric sheet. Lyrics are provided in both English and Japanese. The regular release came with a white CD holder instead of the more traditional gray-black holder.

The second version is a limited edition version that comes in a coffin box. Only 1000 of these coffin versions were released. It comes with everything that is in the regular version, but also includes four photographs (Photo 1, Photo 2, Photo 3, Photo 4) and a numbered certificate. (Certificate 1, Certificate 2)

The third and final version is an Australian re-release of the standard version. The only differences between this and the original version is the lack of Japanese language material, the slightly different disc and spinal printing, and the disc comes on the traditional gray-black disc holder.

Track listing

Track sources
Tracks 1-2 were originally released as b-sides to "Been Caught Stealing".
Track 3 was originally released as a b-side to "Been Caught Stealing" and "Classic Girl".
Track 4 was originally released on The Shocking EP.
Tracks 5-6 is simply the Ritual de lo Habitual album version of "Three Days" separated over two tracks (plays seamlessly), as released on the 7" single.
Track 7 originally appeared as a b-side to "Three Days" and "Stop!".
Track 8 is mislabeled on the packaging as being a "Demo" when it is, in fact, simply the Nothing's Shocking studio album version. The track appears as a b-side on the "Three Days/Stop!" single and is mislabeled there, as well. 
Tracks 9-10 were originally released as b-sides to "Classic Girl". Track 10, "Ain't No Right (live)," also appears in extended, remastered form on the Kettle Whistle album.

References

Jane's Addiction albums
1991 live albums
1991 compilation albums
Warner Records compilation albums
Warner Records live albums